Ben Zwiehoff (born 22 February 1994) is a German cross-country and road cyclist, who currently rides for UCI WorldTeam . He won three medals in the European Mountain Bike Championships from to 2014 to 2016.

Major results

Mountain Bike
2014
 2nd  Mixed relay, UEC European Championships
2015
 1st  Mixed relay, UEC European Championships
2016
 3rd  Mixed relay, UEC European Championships
2018
 3rd Cross-country, National Championships
2019
 2nd Cross-country, National Championships

Road
2022
 9th Trofeo Serra de Tramuntana
 10th Trofeo Calvià
2023
 8th Overall UAE Tour
 8th Trofeo Calvia

Grand Tour general classification results timeline

References

External links

German male cyclists
Cross-country mountain bikers
1994 births
Living people
Sportspeople from Essen
German mountain bikers
Cyclists from North Rhine-Westphalia